Sri Prasanna Venkata Narasimha Perumal is a Hindu temple in Saidapet, Chennai, in the Indian state of Tamil Nadu. It is dedicated to Venkateswara, an incarnation of the Hindu deity Vishnu. It was constructed during the 12th century, but, according to historical records and inscriptions found within the temple, may consist of elements dating back more than 1000 years. The temple was constructed during the era when the South India was under the rule of the Vijayanagara Empire.

The temple is also known as "Prasanna Venkata Narshimar" due to the visit of Theliyasingher who is kovthugar of the temple.

The temple's regional legend states that Sri Prasanna Venkata Narasimha is incarnated with his divine consorts Sridevi and Bhudevi, facing east, in the Garbha Graha (sanctum sanctorum) of the temple.

History
The temple is believed to have been constructed by the Balija Chetty community. When Vijayanagara monarchs like Krishnadeva Raya and Achyuta Raya who were devotees of Venkatesvara at Tirumala (Tirupati) ruled the region until the 16th century CE, many temples for Venkatesa Perumal were built in the Tamil region.

The Ramanuja Vijaya Vilasam hall near the temple was built in 1901, which is now known as Ramanuja Koodam.

Features
The temple's 36-feet-tall wooden chariot is taken in procession during the annual festival. A Thanjavur painting of Rama Pattabhisekam is being worshipped in the temple.

Deities
Images of the following deities and saints are present in this temple:
 Anjaneya, located opposite to the Sri Ramar Sannidhi and called Bhakta Anjaneyar.
 Senai Mutalavar
 Nammalvar and Thirumangai Alvar, incarnated in a sannidhi adjacent to Sri Ramar.
 Ramanujar, Pillai Lokachariyar, and Manavala Mamunigal.
 Adishesha
 Sri Alarmelmangai Tayar Sannidhi, situated on southern side

 Sri Andal Sannidhi situated on the northern side of Perumal Sannidhi, facing east
 Pushkarani (holy tank) situated near the temple premises
 Unjal Mandapam, where Unjal seva of the temple is performed during Brahmohsavam

Vahanas
The vahanas refer to the mounts of deities.

Vahanas in the temple include:
 Surya Prabhai / Chandra Prabhai
 Hamsam Vahanam
 Karpagavriksham
 Garuda Vahanam
 Hanumantha Vahanam
 Sesha Vahanam
 Simma Vahanam
 Pallakku
 Yali Vahanam
 Gaja Vahanam
 Thirutther
 Mangala Giri
 Kudhirai Vahanam
 Punniya Kodi Vimanam

Utsavams (festivals)
 Masi Magam - celebrated in Masi
 Thotta Utsavam: Masi
 Panguni Uththiram: Panguni
 Sri Rama Navami: Panguni
 Brahmotsavam: Cittirai
 Vasanthotsvam: Vaikāci
 Thiruadippooram: Aadi
 Pavithrothsavam: Aippasi
 Pagal Pathu and Era Pathu: Mārkaḻi
 Alvar and Acharyars Thirunakshatrams

Other observances
On all Fridays, the statue of Sri Alarmelmangai Tayar is taken for a procession inside the temple premises.

Also Sri Prasanna Venkata Narasimha Perumal and the Alvars and acharyas are taken in a procession inside the temple on the Thirunakshatrams which are special and specific to them.

Once a year, Sri Paarthasaarathy Perumal from Triplicane visits this temple in the month of February, during the Thotta Utsavam festival.

Also Mylapore Sri Aadhi Kesava Perumal visits this temple. During this visit a special Thirumanjam is performed for him.

See also
 Heritage structures in Chennai

References

Hindu temples in Chennai